Sidi ibn Ibrahim ibn Hasdai al-Tarās (Hebrew: סידי בן אברהם בן חסדאי אלתראס) (Arabic: سيدي بن ابراهيم بن حدادي التاراس) also called Sidi ibn al-Tarās was an 11th-century Sephardic Karaite scholar.

Born to the al-Taras family in Castile, Spain around 1065. Several sources written by Joseph ben Tzaddik and Abraham ibn Daud state that in his early years, al-Taras became a disciple of the Karaite scholar Jeshua ben Judah. He eventually returned to Spain settling around Andalusia, where he attempted to gain Karaite followers amongst the Rabbanites. This made al-Taras a highly controversial figure leading to the expulsion of the Karaites in Castile by Alfonso VI, who was pressured by local Jewish communities to do so.

References 

Karaite Jews
Spanish Jews
11th-century Sephardi Jews